Martin L. Lueck (July 24, 1872July 18, 1926) was an American politician and judge.  He was a Wisconsin Circuit Court Judge for 15 years and was the Democratic Party nominee for Governor of Wisconsin in 1924.

Biography
Lueck was born on July 24, 1872, in Juneau, Wisconsin.  His parents were German American immigrants and had settled in Juneau in 1870.  His father immigrated as a boy in 1852.  He volunteered with the Union Army in the American Civil War, and served at the Battle of Gettysburg with the 26th Wisconsin Volunteer Infantry Regiment.

Martin attended the public schools in Juneau and graduated from the law department of the University of Wisconsin in 1894.  He returned to Juneau and established a legal practice.  He was elected district attorney for Dodge County, Wisconsin, in 1898, and earned re-election in 1900.  He worked as City Attorney in Juneau and was elected mayor in 1906.

In 1907, he was appointed to the Wisconsin Circuit Court by Governor James O. Davidson to fill the vacancy caused by the death of Judge James J. Dick.  He was elected to remain on the court in 1911, and was re-elected in 1917.  He left office in 1922.

He was the Democratic nominee for Governor of Wisconsin in 1924, but was defeated in the general election by incumbent John J. Blaine.

Family and personal life

In May 1904, (differing info has been given as to the exact date) Lueck married Hedwig M. Kuentzel. They had three daughters.

Martin Lueck died on July 18, 1926, and was buried in Juneau, Wisconsin.

Electoral history

| colspan="6" style="text-align:center;background-color: #e9e9e9;"| General Election, November 4, 1924

References

External links

People from Juneau, Wisconsin
Mayors of places in Wisconsin
District attorneys in Wisconsin
Wisconsin city attorneys
Wisconsin state court judges
Wisconsin Democrats
University of Wisconsin Law School alumni
1872 births
1926 deaths
Burials in Wisconsin
People of Wisconsin in the American Civil War
20th-century American judges
19th-century American lawyers
20th-century American lawyers